Future Bank B.S.C. is a commercial bank that was based in Manama, Bahrain. It started as a joint venture by Ahli United Bank and two Iranian state-owned banks, Bank Melli and Bank Saderat.

Central Bank of Bahrain closed down the bank in 2016 after Bahrain cut diplomatic ties with Iran. In 2017, Central Bank of the Islamic Republic of Iran licensed the bank to open a branch in Kish Island.

References 

Banks of Bahrain
Bahrain–Iran relations
Joint ventures
2004 establishments in Bahrain
Banks established in 2004
Foreign banks in Iran
Companies based in Manama